Sycorax  is the largest retrograde irregular satellite of Uranus. Sycorax was discovered on 6 September 1997 by Brett J. Gladman, Philip D. Nicholson, Joseph A. Burns, and John J. Kavelaars using the 200-inch Hale telescope, together with Caliban, and given the temporary designation S/1997 U 2.

Officially confirmed as Uranus XVII, it was named after Sycorax, Caliban's mother in William Shakespeare's play The Tempest.

Orbit 

Sycorax follows a distant orbit, more than 20 times further from Uranus than the furthest regular moon, Oberon. Its orbit is retrograde, moderately inclined and eccentric. The orbital parameters suggest that it may belong, together with Setebos and Prospero, to the same dynamic cluster, suggesting common origin.

The diagram illustrates the orbital parameters of the retrograde irregular satellites of Uranus (in polar co-ordinates) with the eccentricity of the orbits represented by the segments extending from the pericentre to the apocentre.

Physical characteristics 

The diameter of Sycorax is estimated at 165 km based on the thermal emission data from Spitzer and Herschel Space telescopes making it the largest irregular satellite of Uranus, comparable in size with Puck and with Himalia, the biggest irregular satellite of Jupiter.

The satellite appears light-red in the visible spectrum (colour indices  ,), redder than Himalia but still less red than most Kuiper belt objects. However, in the near infrared, the spectrum turns blue between 0.8 and 1.25 μm and finally becomes neutral at the longer wavelengths.

The rotation period of Sycorax is estimated at about 6.9 hours. Rotation causes periodical variations of the visible magnitude with the amplitude of 0.12. The rotation axis of Sycorax is unknown, though measurements of its light curve suggest it is being viewed at a near equator-on configuration. In this case, Sycorax may have a north pole right ascension around 356° and a north pole declination around 45°.

Origin 
It is hypothesized that Sycorax is a captured object; it did not form in the accretion disk which existed around Uranus just after its formation. No exact capture mechanism is known, but capturing a moon requires the dissipation of energy. Possible capture processes include gas drag in the protoplanetary disk and many-body interactions and capture during the fast growth of Uranus's mass (so-called pull-down).

See also 
 Moons of Uranus
 Irregular moons

References

External links 

 Sycorax Profile (by NASA's Solar System Exploration)
 David Jewitt pages
 Uranus' Known Satellites (by Scott S. Sheppard)
 MPC: Natural Satellites Ephemeris Service

Moons of Uranus
Irregular satellites
19970906
Moons with a retrograde orbit